'Valeriana extincta' formerly known as Valerianella affinis was a species of plant in the family Caprifoliaceae. It was endemic to Socotra Yemen. It was only found once in Jebel Maaleh near Qalansiyah in 1880 and has not been seen again despite repeated searches in the region.

Resources

affinis
Endemic flora of Yemen
Extinct plants
Extinct biota of Asia
Taxonomy articles created by Polbot
Taxobox binomials not recognized by IUCN